The 13th Assam Legislative Assembly election was held in two phases on 4 and 11 April 2011 to elect members from 126 constituencies in Assam, India. The result was announced on 13 May.  BJP was accused of turning the anti-immigrant feeling in Assam into a Hindu-Muslim row. The election resulted in a landslide victory for the Indian National Congress and its incumbent Chief Minister Tarun Gogoi was sworn in for the third straight term.  Tarun Gogoi became the second Chief Minister (the first was Bimala Prasad Chaliha) to be elected Chief Minister for the third consecutive term and formed his third ministry.

Results

Results by Constituency

References 

2011 State Assembly elections in India
State Assembly elections in Assam
2010s in Assam